JetLink Express was a Kenyan regional airline with its head office in the Freight Complex in Embakasi, Nairobi. It operated out of Jomo Kenyatta International Airport.

All flight activities have been stopped since 16 November 2012, due to financial problems.

On 28 January 2013 Fastjet announced that it had signed a Memorandum of Understanding ("MoU") with Jetlink.  Under the terms of the MoU, Fastjet and Jetlink were to create a joint venture which would lead to the launch of the Fastjet brand in Kenya. The MoU is subject to a number of conditions precedent, including Board and any other necessary approvals.

Destinations
Jetlink Express served the following:

Eldoret - Eldoret International Airport
Kisumu - Kisumu Airport
Mombasa - Moi International Airport
Nairobi - Jomo Kenyatta International Airport hub

Juba - Juba Airport

Mwanza - Mwanza Airport

Fleet
As of December 2010, the JetLink Express fleet consisted of the following aircraft with an average age of 17.7 years:

References

External links

Defunct airlines of Kenya
Airlines established in 2006
Airlines disestablished in 2012